This is a list of spaceflights launched between July and September 1962. For launches in the rest of the year, see 1962 in spaceflight (January–March), 1962 in spaceflight (April–June) and 1962 in spaceflight (October–December). For an overview of the whole year, see 1962 in spaceflight.

Launches

|colspan=8 style="background:white;"|

July
|-

|colspan=8 style="background:white;"|

August
|-

|colspan=8 style="background:white;"|

September
|-

|}

References

07
1962 in spaceflight 07